Manohari Singh (8 March 1931 – 13 July 2010) was an Indian music director, saxophonist and was the main arranger of  seminal film composer R. D. Burman. He along worked with Basudeb Chakraborty as music composers, the duo also popularly known as Basu-Manohari.

Early life
Manohari Singh was born in a Nepalese Bhusal family in Kolkata. His father and uncle used to play in brass bands. In 1942, he joined the brass band at Bata Shoe Company, Bata Nagar in Kolkata, under its Hungarian conductor Joseph Newman. When Newman left in 1945 to join HMV, Manohari followed. From classical music, he started playing Hindi and Bengali songs for the HMV orchestra, since Newman arranged music for many composers like Kamal Dasgupta, S D Burman, Timir Baran and Ravi Shankar. He also played flute and piccolo at the Calcutta Symphony Orchestra. Through fellow musicians such as Francisco Casanovas, conductor at the Symphony Orchestra and band-leader at Firpo's Restaurant, George Banks, trumpet player at the Grand Hotel, and others, Manohari was introduced to the Calcutta nightclub scene. He had already tried his hand at the English key flute, the clarinet and the mandolin, but now he decided to learn the saxophone in order to be able to play at nightclubs.

Career
When the conductor Joseph Newman left HMV in 1950 to settle in Australia, Manohari moved on to play at Firpo's with his own band. Urged by the music director Salil Chowdhury, Manohari decided to try his luck in Mumbai, moving there in 1958. His first break in the Hindi film industry was in 1958 with Sachin Dev Burman, as a saxophonist for the movie Sitaron Se Aage. He went on to play with many other music directors, his strongest association being with R.D. Burman, for whom he played the saxophone in many compositions. In addition to playing the alto saxophone, Manohari Singh was also the music assistant and arranger for R. D. Burman.

Memorable Hits
Among other notable works, Manohari played on the well-known hit "Gaata Rahe Mera Dil", composed by S.D. Burman, from the movie Guide. He also played for songs in the movie Chalte Chalte and Veer Zaara. He also released an album titled Sax appeal containing saxophone renditions of various Hindi movie music tracks Manohari Singh was said to deeply cherish his gold-plated Selmer saxophone (bought in New York City in 1969) and tried to avoid getting even his own finger-prints on it.He (as Basu-Manohari) composed for "Sabse Bada Rupaiya", produced by Mehmood, starring Vinod Mehra and Moushmi Chatterji in lead rode. Here in a romantic song "Wada karo sajan", one can enjoy the same beauty and touch of Panchanda.

Awards
Manohari Singh was felicitated at the Yashwantrao Chavan Natya Gruha (auditorium) on 19 March 2006, on the occasion of his 75 birthday. He was  also awarded with "Memorable Contribution to Music Award" at the Tata Indicom Radio Mirchi Music Awards function held on 27 March 2009.

Death
Manohari Singh died after a Cardiac Arrest on 13 July 2010 in Mumbai.

Selected filmography
Santaan-1989 - Nepalese Movie
Kanyadan- 1991- Nepalese Movie
'Sabse Bada Rupaiya - 1976 - Hindi movie (as Basu-Manohari)

Memorable Nepali songs

References

External links
An article in Hindi about Manohari Singh on The Bhopal Post web-site
IMDB entry on Manohari Singh
Musicians

1931 births
2010 deaths
Musicians from Kolkata
Indian saxophonists
20th-century Indian musicians
20th-century saxophonists
Indian male musicians
20th-century male musicians